Carambis or Karambis was an ancient Greek city of ancient Paphlagonia, on a promontory of the same name. The town is mentioned in the Periplus of Pseudo-Scylax (under the name Caramus or Karamos) and by Pliny the Elder. The name occurs as Carambas in the Peutinger Table.

The promontory is now known as Kerempe Burnu. Its site is tentatively located near Fakas, Kastamonu Province, Turkey.

References

Populated places in ancient Paphlagonia
Former populated places in Turkey
History of Kastamonu Province
Ancient Greek archaeological sites in Turkey